McCleery is a surname. Notable people with the surname include:

Alan McCleery (born 1929), Canadian sprint canoeist
Albert McCleery (1911–1972), American television producer
Finnis D. McCleery (1927–2002), United States Army soldier of the Vietnam War
James McCleery (1837–1871), American politician
Joe McCleery, Irish football manager
Michael McCleery (born 1959), American actor
Nicola McCleery (born 1995), Scottish netball player
William McCleery (politician) (1887–1957), Northern Irish politician

See also
McCleary